Roman Holliday were a British band active in the 1980s. They are best known in the UK for their hit single "Don't Try to Stop It", which reached number 14 on the UK Singles Chart in the summer of 1983. A follow-up, "Motormania", peaked at number 40.

Career
The band was established in November 1980 by Brian Bonhomme, Steve Lambert, Simon Cohen and Peter Noone (the latter of whom left shortly after the band's formation). Later on, Rob Lambert and Jon Durno joined, followed by Soho Square busker, John Eacott.  At the end of 1982, Adrian York joined the band as a piano player. Tony Wallman was in the band briefly (before the band became successful). After John Peel saw the band at the Jive Dive swing club in London, they recorded two sessions for his show. Mick Jones, then of the Clash, also saw them and invited them to support his band, which led to a signing to Jive Records. "Don't Try to Stop It" was their second single for Jive and became a hit in summer 1983. The follow-up, "Motormania" failed to achieve the same success and the parent album Cookin' on the Roof, released in late 1983, achieved only modest success.
In 1984, both brass men, Rob Lambert and John Eacott left the band.

In the United States, the group achieved exposure through MTV, which aired their "Stand By" video.  The single went to number one on the Canadian Adult Contemporary chart in November 1983. Roman Holliday also charted in Japan on the international, as well as the domestic market, with "Hear It in the Night" and the Robert John "Mutt" Lange written and produced track, "One Foot Back in Your Door". Both singles went top 10.

Bonhomme is currently employed at Youngstown State University. He is a professor of Russian history, and teaches a number of courses in modern European history and environmental history.

Band members
Roman Holliday was mainly composed of:
 Steve Lambert, born  in Mile End, London – singer
 Brian Bonhomme, born  in Harlow, Essex – guitar / vocals
 Simon Cohen, born  in Kings Cross, London　— drums
 Adrian York, born  in Chiswick, London – piano
 Jon Durno, born  in Enfield, London — bass
 John Eacott, born  in Reading, Berkshire  — trumpet
 Rob Lambert, born  in Epping, Essex  — saxophone

Discography

Albums
 Roman Holliday (1983) Jive / Arista / Sony / BMG – U.S. No. 142
 Cookin' on the Roof (1983) Jive / Arista / Sony / BMG – UK No. 31; U.S. No. 116
 Fire Me Up (1984) Jive / Arista / Sony / BMG – U.S. No. 201

Singles
"Stand By" (1983) - UK No. 61; AUS No. 71; U.S. No. 54; U.S. CB No. 57
"Don't Try to Stop It" (1983) - UK No. 14; U.S. No. 68; U.S. CB No. 66
"Motormania" (1983) - UK No. 40
"One Foot Back in Your Door" (12")
"Fire Me Up" (1984)
"Touch Too Much" (1984)
"One Foot Back in Your Door" (1985) - U.S. No. 76

Japanese albums
 ローマの休日/Cookin' on the Roof (CBS Sony)
 涙のラストクルーズ/Fire Me Up (CBS Sony)
 ティーチャーズ/TEACHERS – original soundtrack from the Aaron Russo produced motion picture One Foot Back in Your Door

Japanese singles
"スタンバイ/Stand By"
"俺らはハリキリボーイ/Don't Try to Stop It"
"恋のモーターマニア/Motormania"
"涙のラストクルーズ/Hear It in the Night"
"ワン•フット•バック/One Foot Back in Your Door"

DVD and LaserDisk
Live in Tokyo (1985) <厚生年金大ホール/Koseinenkin Big Hall>

References

External links
Bonhomme's website
Roman Holliday official website
Lambert's official website
Tribute Japanese website
York's website and London lifestyle reviews
steve lambert music | Discogs

English pop music groups
English new wave musical groups
Musical groups established in 1980
Musical groups disestablished in 1985
Jive Records artists